The 1971 Ontario general election was held on October 21, 1971, to elect the 117 members of the 29th Legislative Assembly of Ontario (Members of Provincial Parliament, or "MPPs") of the Province of Ontario.

The Ontario Progressive Conservative Party, led by Bill Davis, who had replaced John Robarts as PC leader and premier earlier in the year, won a ninth consecutive term in office, and maintained its majority in the legislature, increasing its caucus in the legislature by eight seats from its result in the previous election.

The Ontario Liberal Party, led by Robert Nixon, lost seven seats, but continued in the role of official opposition.

The social democratic Ontario New Democratic Party, led by Stephen Lewis, lost one seat.

This election marked the first time that the provincial election was held on a Thursday.  Subsequently, every provincial election has also been held on a Thursday, with the exception of the 2007 Ontario general election, which was held on a Wednesday.

Results

See also
Politics of Ontario
List of Ontario political parties
Premier of Ontario
Leader of the Opposition (Ontario)

Notes

References

1971 elections in Canada
1971
1971 in Ontario
October 1971 events in Canada